Rockport State Park is a  public recreation area at the foot of Sauk Mountain in Skagit County, Washington. The park offers five miles of hiking trails including the Sauk Mountain Trail and the Evergreen Trail which traverses the old-growth forest.

Climate

The park is located in the marine west coast climate zone of western North America. Most weather fronts originate in the Pacific Ocean, and travel northeast toward the Cascade Mountains. As fronts approach, they are forced upward by the peaks of the Cascade Range (Orographic lift), causing them to drop their moisture in the form of rain or snowfall onto the Cascades. As a result, the west side of the North Cascades experiences high precipitation, especially during the winter months in the form of snowfall. During winter months, weather is usually cloudy, but, due to high pressure systems over the Pacific Ocean that intensify during summer months, there is often little or no cloud cover during the summer.

References

External links

Rockport State Park Washington State Parks and Recreation Commission 
Rockport State Park Map Washington State Parks and Recreation Commission

Parks in Skagit County, Washington
State parks of Washington (state)
Protected areas established in 1961